Henry Rogers Beor (7 February 1846 – 25 December 1880) was a politician in colonial Queensland and Attorney-General of Queensland.

Early life 
Beor was the son of Henry Beor, a solicitor at Swansea, in South Wales. He graduated at Oxford, and was called to the bar at the Middle Temple in 1870. In 1875, he went to Queensland, and was admitted to the bar there in the same year.

Politics 
Entering the Queensland Legislative Assembly as member for Bowen in 1877, he succeeded the late Mr. Justice Ratcliffe Pring as Attorney-General in the first McIlwraith Ministry in June 1880. He in the same year was made Q.C.

Later life 
Shortly afterwards his health failed, and he shot himself on board the steamer Rotorua, whilst on the passage from Sydney to Auckland, in New Zealand. The fatal event, the outcome of nervous depression, took place on 25 December 1880, and he was buried at sea.

References

Attorneys-General of Queensland
Members of the Queensland Legislative Assembly
1846 births
1880 deaths
Colony of Queensland people
Australian politicians who committed suicide
19th-century Australian politicians
Suicides by firearm in Australia
1880s suicides
Deaths by firearm in international waters